Tommy Holmgren (born 9 January 1959) is a Swedish former footballer who played as a midfielder. Holmgren played his whole career for IFK Göteborg and won four Allsvenskan titles, three Swedish cups and two UEFA Cups with them. He also played several matches for Sweden's football team.

In a World Cup qualifier against Malta in 1984, Holmgren got kicked in the head by an opponent. He was out for a long time and when he came back he was not as good as he had been previously, before the incident many European clubs wanted to sign Holmgren but after it, nearly all of them stopped trying to sign him and he instead played on for Göteborg.

He is the younger brother of Tord Holmgren.

References

External links
 

1959 births
Living people
Association football midfielders
Swedish footballers
Sweden international footballers
IFK Göteborg players
Allsvenskan players
UEFA Cup winning players